Liravi may refer to:
 Liravi-ye Jonubi Rural District
 Liravi-ye Miyani Rural District
 Liravi-ye Shomali, Iran
 Liravi-ye Shomali Rural District